Malvern College is a fee-charging coeducational boarding and day school in Malvern, Worcestershire, England. It is a public school in the British sense of the term and is a member of the Rugby Group and of the Headmasters' and Headmistresses' Conference. Since its foundation in 1865, it has remained on the same grounds, which are located near the town centre of Great Malvern. The campus, now covering some 250 acres (101 ha), is near the Malvern Hills.

There are currently about 650 pupils enrolled at the school, aged between 13 and 19. Additionally, there are about 310 pupils aged from 3 to 13 at The Downs, Malvern College prep school, in nearby Colwall in Herefordshire. Across the two schools, in total, there are nearly 1000 pupils.

Among the alumni of the college are at least two Commonwealth prime ministers, two Nobel laureates (five Nobel Prizes including prep school alumni), an Olympic gold medalist and many other notable persons from various fields. The novelist C. S. Lewis, author of The Chronicles of Narnia, was a pupil of the school.

The college has five overseas campuses, Malvern College Qingdao, Malvern College Chengdu in China, Malvern College Egypt in Cairo  , Egypt, Malvern College Hong Kong located in Pak Shek Kok, New Territories, Hong Kong, adjacent to the Hong Kong Science Park, Malvern College Switzerland in Leysin and Malvern College Tokyo which is set to open in September 2023.

History

Set in the Malvern Hills, the school's location owes much to Malvern's emergence in the nineteenth century as a fashionable spa resort, appreciated for its unpolluted air and the healing qualities of its famous spring water. The school opened its doors for the first time on 25 January 1865 under the headship of the Arthur Faber. Initially, there were only twenty-four boys, of whom eleven were day boys, six masters and two houses, named Mr McDowall's (No.1) and Mr Drew's (No.2). The new school expanded. One year later, there were sixty-four boys. By 1875, there were 200 on the roll and five boarding houses ; by the end of the 19th century, the numbers had risen to more than 400 boys and ten houses. American poet Henry Wadsworth Longfellow visited the school in 1868, Prince Christian of Schleswig-Holstein and Princess Helena of the United Kingdom on speech-day in 1870, and Francis, Duke of Teck, and Princess Mary Adelaide of Cambridge visited in 1891 with their daughter, Mary of Teck (later Queen Mary). Lord Randolph Churchill's speech-day comments on education in 1889 were reported in The Times. The school was one of the twenty four public schools listed in the Public Schools Yearbook of 1889 and was incorporated by royal charter in 1928. Further expansion of pupil numbers and buildings continued between the end of the First World War in 1918 and the start of the Second World War in 1939.

During the two Wars, 457 and 258 former pupils, respectively, gave their lives. Seven former pupils took part in the Battle of Britain. In 1925, the War Memorial Library was built to the designs of Sir Aston Webb, with the chimney piece in the upper chamber created by Leonard Shuffrey.

During World War II, the college premises were requisitioned by the Admiralty between October 1939 and July 1940, and the school temporarily relocated to Blenheim Palace. In 1942, its premises were again needed for governmental use, on this occasion by the TRE and, from May 1942 to July 1946, the school was housed with Harrow School. QinetiQ, a private sector successor to the government's original research facility, is still sited on former college land.

Having traditionally been a school for boys aged from 13 to 18 years old, in 1992 it merged with Ellerslie Girls’ School and Hillstone prep school to become a coeducational school for pupils aged 3 to 18 years old. The college also departed from the full boarding tradition of the English public school and allows day pupils, although over two-thirds of pupils board. In September 2008, the College's Prep School merged with The Downs prep school on the latter's nearby site in Colwall, Herefordshire to form The Downs, Malvern College Prep School.

Recent developments
The year 2008 also saw the start of a development scheme that included a new sports complex, new athletics and viewing facilities at the pitches and two new boarding houses. The sports complex and new houses were opened in October 2009. Ellerslie House was opened for girls, commemorating the eponymous former girls' school, and the other new house has become the new permanent residence for the boys of No. 7.

In 2010 part of the school suffered very serious damage when fire broke out on 10 April in one of the boarding houses. The 1871 Grade II listed building which was the boarding house for 55 girls and living accommodation of the housemistress and her family, was almost completely destroyed. Over 70 firefighters and 13 fire engines from Malvern, Worcester and Stourport-on-Severn depots fought the blaze. The fire was confined to the living quarters of the housemistress and her family, who were away at the time. No pupils were in the building, as the term had finished. The house reopened on 18 April.

The original preparatory school, Hillstone, opened in 1883. When the college went coeducational, Hillstone was absorbed into Malvern to become its prep department. The prep school merged with The Downs, a Quaker school founded in 1900, and the new school is now known as The Downs Malvern.

Boarding is available to pupils in the prep school aged 7 and above, who reside in a separate boarding house known as The Warren.

Structure

Governance 
The school is governed by a College Council of approximately fifteen members, chaired by Robin Black. Educationalist and former cricketer Antony Clark joined the school as Headmaster in 2008.

After Clarke's departure in 2019, the school announced Keith Metcalfe would replace him as Headmaster.

Admissions

Educational and social care standards 
An Ofsted report, following an October 2010 inspection, rated the school's services against specific criteria and assigned an overall quality rating of Grade 1 (outstanding). This compares to an overall rating of Grade 2 (good) in the previous report published in 2008. In the latest report, "organisation" and health and safety provision were upgraded to Grade 1 while boarding accommodation was rated Grade 2. Other areas assessed included "helping children to achieve", to "make a positive contribution" and to "enjoy what they do" and these remained Grade 1 (outstanding).  The report states that four recommendations made in Ofsted's last report had all been addressed and that the school "delivers an outstanding service that continues to be developed".

Curriculum

Structure 
While academic success is considered important, emphasis is also placed on the all-round development of the individual rather than on academic results alone. In the Sixth Form, courses are offered at A-Level in art, business studies, classical civilisation, design and technology, drama and theatre studies, economics, English literature, geography, Greek, history, history of art, key skills, Latin, mathematics, modern languages (French, German, Spanish), music, music technology, physical education, politics and the sciences (biology, chemistry, physics). The International Baccalaureate (IB) has further been available in the Sixth Form at Malvern since 1992. Further courses and special arrangements are sometimes made for other courses upon request.

Academic performance 
In both the 2008 and 2010 Ofsted reports, a Grade 1 (outstanding) rating was assigned for "helping children to achieve", to "make a positive contribution" and to "enjoy what they do". In 2010, the school was, according to OFSTED, ranked 28th among private schools for value added to its students' A Level results, placing it within the top 5% nationally. In 2011, it was 79th among co-ed independent boarding schools for A-Level results. The school's pupils have achieved particularly good results at IB level. In 2011, the school was ranked 18th for the average grades of its IB pupils. In 2012, The Independent review of both A level and IB results, based on government-issued statistics, ranked Malvern 32nd in the UK with 1080.7 points. In 2019, 29% of pupils scored A*-A for their A-Levels examination, whereas 60% scored A*-A for their GCSEs. For IB, 27% of the 2019 cohort scored 40 or more IB points.

Extracurricular activities 

The college plays sports such as football, cricket, rugby, rackets, fives, athletics, tennis, squash, croquet, basketball, badminton, golf and polo. At the school, boys play hockey and girls play cricket and football.

On 16 October 2009, a new sports complex and hospitality suite was opened by The Duke of York. The opening was attended by several well known sports personalities including athlete Dame Kelly Holmes, cricketers Michael Vaughan and Graham Gooch, footballer Peter Shilton, rugby union player Jason Leonard, athlete Christina Boxer and hockey player Rachel Walker. The indoor complex, which was built on the site of the old sports hall and swimming pool, offers an 8 court sports hall, a dance studio and fitness suite, a climbing wall, two squash courts, a shooting range, a large function suite, and a 6 lane swimming pool and its facilities are also available for use by the wider community. They are also used by Worcestershire County Cricket Club for their winter training programme. In February 2010, the school also hosted the England Blind Cricket squad for training sessions.

Traditions 

The school song, "Carmen Malvernense", was written and composed by two masters, M. A. Bayfield and R. E. Lyon. It was first sung on speech day in 1888. The same song became the school song of Eastbourne College when Bayfield became headmaster there in 1895.

Innovations

The college has a history of innovation in the field of education. In 1963, it was the first independent school to have a language laboratory. It is thought to be the first school in the country to have had a careers service. Under the direction of John Lewis, it pioneered Nuffield Physics in the 1960s, Science in Society in the 1970s, and the Diploma of Achievement in the 1990s. At the beginning of the 1990s, Malvern College became one of the first schools in Britain to offer the choice between the International Baccalaureate and A-Levels in the Sixth Form. The school was one of the first boys' public schools to become fully coeducational from the preparatory department to sixth form.

Each summer the staff and some older pupils run a summer school, Young Malvern, which incorporates many sports, activities and learning experiences. Malvern College is one of the two schools in the country (the other being Dulwich College) to offer debating in the curriculum and pupils participate in regional and national competitions including the Debating Matters competition and the Three Counties Tournament. The subject is compulsory at Foundation Year level.

Notable alumni

Among the alumni of the college since its foundation in 1865 are Nobel laureates, Olympic gold medalists and many other notable persons from various fields including heads of state, high ranking military personnel, royalty, media personalities, scientists, and sports people.

The school's alumni ("old boys") are known as Old Malvernians, or OMs. The Malvernian Society holds many annual reunions and events. Old Malvernians, including former pupils of The Downs, Hillstone, and Ellerslie schools which have merged with Malvern College, benefit from a remission in fees for their own children. Other Old Malvernian clubs and societies include OM Lodge, Court Games, Golf, Sailing, Shooting, the Old Malvernians Cricket Club, and the Old Malvernians Football Club, a club competing in the Arthurian League.

See also

List of masters of Malvern College

 Henry Morgan, founder of the Morgan Motor Company who assembled the prototype Morgan car at the school in 1909.
 Pepper v Hart, a landmark decision of the House of Lords.
 The Southern Railway named each of its 40 V Class locomotives after English public schools. The nameplate for the "Malvern" locomotive (no. 929) is displayed in the school's Memorial Library.
 C.S. Lewis in his book Surprised by Joy describes his experience at Wyvern College, a pseudonym for Malvern College

References

Further reading
   ASIN: B0000CMFA4

 

Allen, Roy (2014), Malvern College, Shire Publication Ltd,

External links
 Malvern College official web site
 The Downs, Malvern College Preparatory School web site
 Profile at the Good Schools Guide
 Profile at the Guide to Independent Schools
 Profile on the ISC website
 ISI Inspection Reports – The Downs Prep & Senior School
 OFSTED Social Care Inspection Reports

Boarding schools in Worcestershire
Educational institutions established in 1865
Private schools in Worcestershire
Schools in Malvern, Worcestershire
Member schools of the Headmasters' and Headmistresses' Conference
 
Racquets venues
International Baccalaureate schools in England
1865 establishments in England
Schools with a royal charter